The Shark Trust is a charitable organization founded in the United Kingdom in 1997. It is dedicated to promoting the study, management and conservation of sharks, skates and rays (elasmobranchs) in the UK and internationally.

TheTrust works on various projects. With a specific focus on collaborating and working with fishers, fisheries management organisations, scientists, conservationists and other third-sector organisations. The Trust has produced codes of conduct for approaching basking sharks and whale sharks safely and responsibly.  It also campaigns for legislative protection of vulnerable shark species and for tighter legislation restricting shark finning.

The Shark Trust holds outreach and engagement events for the public. One of the biggest projects is The Great Eggcase Hunt. This project empowers the public to find shark, skate and ray eggcases on their beach and log them. The data is used to monitor species distribution.

References

External links
 Shark Trust website

Animal charities based in the United Kingdom
Sharks
Organizations established in 1997